Annie Famose (born 16 June 1944) is a French former Alpine skier.  She was a member of the dominating French alpine skiing national team in the 1960s. She won two medals at the 1968 Winter Olympics in Grenoble, as well as three medals (including one gold in slalom) at the 1966 World Championships in Portillo, Chile.

Famose was a versatile all-event skier who was a threat to win races in any discipline, but she excelled in the slalom.  She won two World Cup slalom races in 1967, and had a total of 24 podium (top 3) finishes in slalom, giant slalom, and downhill in her career.  She won the slalom World Cup title in 1967 (tied with Marielle Goitschel), while placing third in the race for the overall title.  She retired from competition after the 1972 season.

World Cup victories

References

External links
 
 
 

1944 births
Living people
French female alpine skiers
Olympic alpine skiers of France
Olympic silver medalists for France
Olympic bronze medalists for France
Olympic medalists in alpine skiing
Medalists at the 1968 Winter Olympics
Alpine skiers at the 1964 Winter Olympics
Alpine skiers at the 1968 Winter Olympics
Alpine skiers at the 1972 Winter Olympics
FIS Alpine Ski World Cup champions
Sportspeople from Pyrénées-Atlantiques
Universiade medalists in alpine skiing
Universiade gold medalists for France
Competitors at the 1962 Winter Universiade
Competitors at the 1964 Winter Universiade
Competitors at the 1966 Winter Universiade
20th-century French women